This is a list of the 31 members of the Parliament of Greenland, who were elected members of parliament of Greenland following the 2013 parliamentary elections until the 2014 parliamentary elections.

List

References

Lists of members of the parliament of Greenland